Johan Fischerström (15 September 1944 – 28 September 2016) was a former Swedish handball player who competed in the 1972 Summer Olympics.

In 1972 he was part of the Swedish team which finished seventh in the Olympic tournament. He played three matches and scored three goals.

References

1944 births
2016 deaths
Swedish male handball players
Olympic handball players of Sweden
Handball players at the 1972 Summer Olympics